Albert Sweet (October 29, 1931 – January 3, 2021) was an American executive, entrepreneur, philanthropist and commercial real estate developer and founder and co-chairman of Occidental Entertainment Group Holdings, Inc in Los Angeles, California.

As a philanthropist, he was active in numerous civic, political, and charitable endeavors. His dedication has always been to humanitarian causes that effect people of all backgrounds and faiths.

Civic and philanthropic honors
 2015 The Humanitarian Torch of Learning award from the American Friends of The Hebrew University 
 2014 Honorary Doctorate Degree from the Technion-Israel Institute of Technology 
 2012 Heroes of Hollywood
 2011 Honorary Fellowship from the Technion-Israel Institute of Technology

References

External links
 Occidental Entertainment Group Holdings, Inc.
 Albert Sweet Story

1931 births
2021 deaths
American real estate businesspeople
Businesspeople from California
People from Malibu, California
People from the Bronx